James Seth Frankoff (born August 27, 1988) is an American professional baseball pitcher for the High Point Rockers of the Atlantic League of Professional Baseball. He has played in Major League Baseball (MLB) for the Chicago Cubs, Seattle Mariners and Arizona Diamondbacks and in the KBO League for the Doosan Bears.

Career
He was born in Raleigh, North Carolina and attended Apex High School before attending University of North Carolina at Wilmington. In 2007, he was a member of the United States national baseball team.

Oakland Athletics
He was drafted by the Oakland Athletics in the 27th round of the 2010 Major League Baseball Draft. He made his professional debut in 2010 with the AZL Athletics, and also played for the Low-A Vancouver Canadians, recording a 5-5 record and 2.81 ERA. He split the next year between the Single-A Burlington Bees and Vancouver, accumulating a 6-4 record and 3.60 ERA in 19 appearances. He remained in Burlington for the 2012 season, and was a Mid-season All-Star. In 2013, Frankoff played for the High-A Stockton Ports, pitching to a 2-0 record and 2.78 ERA with 93 strikeouts. He split the 2014 season between the Double-A Midland RockHounds and the Triple-A Sacramento River Cats, recording a 3-3 record and 3.36 ERA, and was also a Mid-season All-star for Midland. He split the 2015 season between Midland and the Triple-A Nashville Sounds, pitching to a 3.71 ERA with 57 strikeouts in 47 games. On March 30, 2016, Frankoff was released by the Athletics organization.

Los Angeles Dodgers
On April 5, 2016, Frankoff signed a minor league contract with the Los Angeles Dodgers organization. He split the year between the Triple-A Oklahoma City Dodgers and the Double-A Tulsa Drillers, accumulating a 4-4 record and 3.89 ERA in 28 total games. On November 7, 2016, he elected free agency.

Chicago Cubs
On November 16, 2016, Frankoff signed a minor league contract with the Chicago Cubs organization. One source said, "he checks most of the boxes ... he rarely walks hitters, which is a standard draw for the Cubs brass," in explaining why Chicago signed him.

On June 8, 2017, Frankoff was selected to the 40-man roster and promoted to the major leagues for the first time. He made his major league debut on June 9, 2017, against the Colorado Rockies relieving in the fifth inning. He allowed two runs in two innings before being optioned down the next day. On September 1, 2017, Frankoff was designated for assignment.

Seattle Mariners
On September 4, 2017, Frankoff was claimed off waivers by the Seattle Mariners. Frankoff was granted his release by the Mariners on December 10, in order to pursue pitching opportunities in South Korea.

Doosan Bears
Frankoff signed with the Doosan Bears of the KBO League on December 12, 2017. In 2017 for the Bears, he recorded an 18-3 record and 3.74 ERA in 28 games. On December 20, 2018, Frankoff re-signed with Doosan for the 2019 season. He pitched to a 9-8 record and 3.61 ERA in 2019 and became a free agent after the year.

San Diego Padres
On February 14, 2020, Frankoff signed a minor league deal with the San Diego Padres organization. Frankoff elected free agency on July 14, 2020.

Seattle Mariners (second stint)
On August 11, 2020, Frankoff signed a minor league contract with the Seattle Mariners. On August 30, 2020, Frankoff's contract was selected to the active roster. He recorded a ghastly 16.88 ERA in 2 games in 2020. On October 19, 2020, Frankoff was outrighted off of the 40-man roster and assigned to the Triple-A Tacoma Rainiers He became a free agent on November 2, 2020.

Arizona Diamondbacks
On January 8, 2021, Frankoff signed a minor league contract with the Arizona Diamondbacks organization. On May 12, 2021, Frankoff was selected to the active roster. On June 15, he was placed on the 60-day injured list with right forearm soreness. On September 8, Frankoff was released by the Diamondbacks. Frankoff had posted a 9.20 ERA in 4 appearances for Arizona.

Diablos Rojos del México
On May 10, 2022, Frankoff signed with the Diablos Rojos del México of the Mexican League. In 2 starts, he registered an 0–1 record with a 12.00 ERA in 6 total innings. Frankoff was released on May 30, 2022.

High Point Rockers
On September 1, 2022, Frankoff signed with the High Point Rockers of the Atlantic League of Professional Baseball.

References

External links

1988 births
Living people
American expatriate baseball players in Canada
American expatriate baseball players in South Korea
Arizona Diamondbacks players
Arizona League Athletics players
Arizona League Dodgers players
Baseball players from Raleigh, North Carolina
Burlington Bees players
Chicago Cubs players
Doosan Bears players
Estrellas Orientales players
American expatriate baseball players in the Dominican Republic
Iowa Cubs players
KBO League pitchers
Leones del Caracas players
Major League Baseball pitchers
Mesa Solar Sox players
Midland RockHounds players
Nashville Sounds players
Navegantes del Magallanes players
American expatriate baseball players in Venezuela
Oklahoma City Dodgers players
Sacramento River Cats players
Seattle Mariners players
Stockton Ports players
Tulsa Drillers players
UNC Wilmington Seahawks baseball players
Vancouver Canadians players
Vermont Lake Monsters players